Innocence Is Kinky is the second studio album by Norwegian musician Jenny Hval. It was released in April 2013 under Rune Grammofon. The title track was released as a music video directed by Zia Anger.

Track listing

Personnel
Jenny Hval – arranger, composer, drum machine, engineer, guitar, keyboards, primary artist, sampling, vocals, background vocals
Ali Chant – engineer, mixer
John Dent – mastering
Stefan Hambrook – engineer
Chris Kaus – quotation author
Kyrre Laastad – arranger, drum machine, drums, keyboards, percussion
Ole Henrik Moe – string arrangements, viola, violin
John Parish – banjo, bass, guitar, keyboards, mixing, producer, trombone
Espen Reinertsen – saxophone
Kari Rønnekleiv – violin
Håvard Volden – arranger, drum machine, acoustic guitar, electric guitar, keyboards

References

External links
Innocence Is Kinky at iTunes.com

2013 albums
Albums produced by John Parish
Rune Grammofon albums
Jenny Hval albums